The Pulitzer Prize for Local Reporting is awarded to an example of "local reporting that illuminates significant issues or concerns."  This Pulitzer Prize was first awarded in 1948. Like most Pulitzers the winner receives a $15,000 award.

History
The Pulitzer Prize for Local Reporting was first awarded from 1948 until 1952. Beginning in 1953, two awards for Local Reporting were given out by the committee, for Local Reporting, Edition Time and for Local Reporting, No Edition Time.

In 1964 the Local Reporting Pulitzers were again renamed to "Local Investigative Specialized Reporting" and "Local General or Spot News Reporting." These prizes existed until 1984, when they were done away with.

In 1985, several new Pulitzer Prizes were introduced, the Pulitzer Prize for Explanatory Journalism (later renamed "Explanatory Reporting"), the Pulitzer Prize for General News Reporting (later renamed "Breaking News Reporting"), the Pulitzer Prize for Investigative Reporting, and the Pulitzer Prize for Specialized Reporting. None of these prizes were reserved specifically for local reporting.

In 2006, the prize committee announced that the Pulitzer Prize for Beat Reporting was going to be replaced by a recreated Pulitzer Prize for Local Reporting. Debbie Cenziper of The Miami Herald became the first reporter to win the re-created Pulitzer for Local Reporting.

The Pulitzer Committee issues an official citation explaining the reasons for the award.

Winners

From 1948 to 1952
 1948: George E. Goodwin, Atlanta Journal, "For his story of the Telfair County vote fraud," published in 1947.
 1949: Malcolm Johnson, New York Sun, "For his series of 24 articles entitled "Crime on the Waterfront" in New York City."  (The film On the Waterfront was based on this series of articles.)
 1950: Meyer Berger, The New York Times, "For his 4,000 word story on the mass killings by Howard Unruh in Camden, N.J."
 1951: Edward S. Montgomery, San Francisco Examiner, "For his series of articles on tax frauds which culminated in an exposé within the Bureau of Internal Revenue."
 1952: George De Carvalho, San Francisco Chronicle, "For his stories of a "ransom racket" extorting money from Chinese in the United States for relations held in Red China."

From 2007 to present
 2007: Debbie Cenziper, Miami Herald, "For reports on waste, favoritism and lack of oversight at the Miami housing agency that resulted in dismissals, investigations and prosecutions."
 2008: David Umhoefer, Milwaukee Journal Sentinel, "For his stories on the skirting of tax laws to pad pensions of county employees, prompting change and possible prosecution of key figures."
 2009: (two winners) Detroit Free Press Staff, and notably Jim Schaefer and M.L. Elrick, "for their uncovering of a pattern of lies by Mayor Kwame Kilpatrick that included denial of a sexual relationship with his female chief of staff, prompting an investigation of perjury that eventually led to jail terms for the two officials." 
 2009: (two winners) Ryan Gabrielson and Paul Giblin of the East Valley Tribune, "for their adroit use of limited resources to reveal, in print and online, how a popular sheriff's focus on immigration enforcement endangered investigation of violent crime and other aspects of public safety." Original series
2010: Raquel Rutledge of the Milwaukee Journal Sentinel "for her penetrating reports on the fraud and abuse in a child-care program for low-wage working parents that fleeced taxpayers and imperiled children, resulting in a state and federal crackdown on providers."
2011: Frank Main, Mark Konkol, and John J. Kim of the Chicago Sun-Times, "For their immersive documentation of violence in Chicago neighborhoods, probing the lives of victims, criminals and detectives as a widespread code of silence impedes solutions."
2012: Sara Ganim and the staff of The Patriot-News, "For courageously revealing and adeptly covering the explosive Penn State sex scandal involving former football coach Jerry Sandusky."
2013: Brad Schrade, Jeremy Olson and Glenn Howatt of Star Tribune (Minneapolis), "For their powerful reports on the spike in infant deaths at poorly regulated day-care homes, resulting in legislative action to strengthen rules.. "
2014: Will Hobson and Michael LaForgia of the Tampa Bay Times, "for their relentless investigation into the squalid conditions that marked housing for the city's substantial homeless population, leading to swift reforms."
2015: Rob Kuznia, Rebecca Kimitch and Frank Suraci of the Daily Breeze, "for their inquiry into widespread corruption in a small, cash-strapped school district, including impressive use of the paper's website."
2016: Michael LaForgia, Cara Fitzpatrick and Lisa Gartner of the Tampa Bay Times, "For exposing a local school board's culpability in turning some county schools into failure factories, with tragic consequences for the community. (Moved by the Board from the Public Service category, where it was also entered.)"
2017: The staff of the Salt Lake Tribune, "For a string of vivid reports revealing the perverse, punitive and cruel treatment given to sexual assault victims at Brigham Young University, one of Utah's most powerful institutions.
2018: The staff of the Cincinnati Enquirer, "For a riveting and insightful narrative and video documenting seven days of Greater Cincinnatis heroin epidemic, revealing how the deadly addiction has ravaged families and communities."
2019: The staff of The Advocate, Baton Rouge, LA, "For a damning portrayal of the state’s discriminatory conviction system, including a Jim Crow-era law, that enabled Louisiana courts to send defendants to jail without jury consensus on the accused’s guilt."
2020: The staff of The Baltimore Sun "for illuminating, impactful reporting on a lucrative, undisclosed financial relationship between the city’s mayor and the public hospital system she helped to oversee."
2021: Kathleen McGrory and Neil Bedi of the Tampa Bay Times  "for resourceful, creative reporting that exposed how a powerful and politically connected sheriff built a secretive intelligence operation that harassed residents and used grades and child welfare records to profile schoolchildren." Original series
2022: Madison Hopkins of the Better Government Association and Cecilia Reyes of the Chicago Tribune, "For a piercing examination of the city’s long history of failed building- and fire-safety code enforcement, which let scofflaw landlords commit serious violations that resulted in dozens of unnecessary deaths."

References

External links 
 Pulitzer.org Winners and Finalists – Local Reporting

Local reporting